Assistant to the Quorum of the Twelve Apostles, commonly shortened to Assistant to the Twelve or Assistant to the Twelve Apostles, was a priesthood calling in the Church of Jesus Christ of Latter-day Saints between 1941 and 1976. As the title of the calling suggests, men who held this position assisted the Quorum of the Twelve Apostles in fulfilling their priesthood responsibilities. Assistants to the Twelve were general authorities, and were generally assigned by the Twelve Apostles to preside over and speak at stake conferences; re-organize stakes; tour missions; and assist in the direction of worldwide missionary work. Like counselors in the First Presidency, Assistant to the Twelve was not a distinct priesthood office—rather, it was a calling that any worthy high priest could be asked to fill.

In April 1941, church president Heber J. Grant called five men to serve as Assistants to the Twelve. No more Assistants to the Twelve were called until 1951; the church continued to call Assistants to the Twelve throughout the 1950s, 1960s, and the first half of the 1970s.

Of the 38 men who held the calling of Assistant to the Twelve, thirteen later became members of the Quorum of the Twelve Apostles: Marion G. Romney, George Q. Morris, Hugh B. Brown, Gordon B. Hinckley, N. Eldon Tanner, Boyd K. Packer, Marvin J. Ashton, L. Tom Perry, David B. Haight, James E. Faust, Neal A. Maxwell, Robert D. Hales, and Joseph B. Wirthlin. Additionally, a former Assistant to the Twelve (Alvin R. Dyer) was ordained to the office of apostle without being made a member of the Quorum of the Twelve. Seven Assistants to the Twelve (Romney, Brown, Dyer, Isaacson, Hinckley, Tanner, and Faust) later served in the church's First Presidency, with one (Hinckley) later becoming the church's president.

In 1976, church president Spencer W. Kimball announced that the calling of Assistant to the Twelve would be discontinued, and that the 22 men then serving in that calling would be ordained to the priesthood office of seventy and assigned to the First Quorum of the Seventy, which had been organized in 1975.
The following individuals held the calling of Assistant to Twelve:

See also
Regional representative of the Twelve

References

 
Leadership positions in the Church of Jesus Christ of Latter-day Saints
Christian organizations established in 1941
Religious organizations disestablished in 1976
Defunct organizational subdivisions of the Church of Jesus Christ of Latter-day Saints
1941 in Christianity
20th-century Mormonism
Quorum of the Twelve Apostles (LDS Church)